Induction chemotherapy is the first-line treatment of cancer with a chemotherapeutic drug. The goal of induction chemotherapy is to cure the cancer.  It may be contrasted with neoadjuvant therapy, with consolidation chemotherapy (intended to kill any cancer cells that survived the initial treatment), and with maintenance chemotherapy given at lower doses after the consolidation phase of treatment is over.

Induction chemotherapy relies on the principle of spatial cooperation. It is beneficial in the control of malignant lymphomas and head and neck squamous cell carcinomas when followed by radiotherapy or when treated concurrently with chemoradiotherapy.

References

Chemotherapy